Klöckner & Co SE (commonly abbreviated as KlöCo) is a German producer-independent steel and metal distributor. Klöckner's core business is the sale of steel and non-ferrous metals. The company has an established distribution network and some 150 locations.

Products and services 
The company's product portfolio is divided into the segments long products (steel beams for the construction industry), flat products (sheet for mechanical engineering companies), hollow section (structural hollow section), stainless and quality steel (high-alloyed round steel bars for machine building), aluminum (aluminum sectional rods for plant construction) and special products, such as plastics, ironware and accessories. Klöckner & Co offers a total of over 200,000 products.

Alongside unprocessed materials and intermediate products, the Klöckner & Co Group provides services such as cutting and splitting steel strip, cutting to length, flame cutting and surface treatment.

History 
On 28 June 1906 the merchant Peter Klöckner set up the Klöckner & Co trading company in Duisburg. The company soon joined the ranks of Germany's largest steel distributors, with numerous branch offices and a broad array of products. Trading underpinned Peter Klöckner's enterprises and was at the heart of his industrial empire comprising mills, factories and plants. They later evolved to become Klöckner-Werke AG and Klöckner-Humboldt-Deutz AG. The first branch offices were set up way back in 1906, the company's very first year, quickly establishing a network of Klöckner & Co locations throughout Germany.

The beginnings 
Born in 1863 in Koblenz, Peter Klöckner had already been working in the iron and steel industry for 24 years when the company was founded. With the founding of Klöckner & Co in 1906, he created a trading company that was strategically in step with the growing iron and steel industry. In addition to the takeovers already completed, Klöckner pursued a course of expansion from the outset. He set up further sales offices in Cologne and Düsseldorf in the year of the company's founding.

Further expansion 
In 1907, Klöckner opened additional offices in Berlin and Magdeburg, followed in 1909 by Hamburg and Dresden. In 1911, the new Mannheim office covered the southwest and established a connection to the production site in Knutange. The branch offices were granted the status of independent companies, each working for its own account under their own managing director. The range of products also expanded, as Klöckner & Co added ore trading and raw materials processing to its previous activities, pig iron trading and steel production.

New business fields 
After the plants in Troisdorf and Düsseldorf had become firmly anchored within the Klöckner Group, its companies covered the entire spectrum of industrial production. 
The trading company served as a connecting link in the production chain, which as early as 1912 extended from ore mines to the manufacture of wire and machinery. In 1913, the company entered the scrap dealing business, which evolved into an especially lucrative branch of iron and steel trading.

World War I 
On 1 August 1914 the German Reich declared war on Russia. The ramifications of the war dealt industry a serious blow and the company faced a major setback. Notably, the draft of many workers also posed a problem for Klöckner. His plant at Knutange in Lorraine, for example, had to cut back production drastically during the war years because many Italians and Poles who had been working there returned to their home countries when the war broke out.

Growth in times of crisis 
Klöckner & Co held its ground through the post-World War I recession, compensating for losses in the steel business by expanding its fields of activity. Sales increased. The scrap trade boomed while other business such as trading pitwood, coal and chemicals generated additional revenues. In the 1920s and ’30s, the company opened its first branches in Europe, South America and North America and set up a special foreign operations department. The steel trader whose business focused chiefly on Germany had now grown into a distributor with international operations and a broad product portfolio. Dividing the company into Klöckner-Werke AG and Klöckner & Co served to further strengthen the independent nature of the distribution activities.

In December 1936, Peter Klöckner's business success was overshadowed by an unexpected tragedy: Waldemar, Klöckner's only son and potential successor, was killed in a car accident. His place at the helm of the business was filled by another family member, Günther Henle, the husband of Peter Klöckner's stepdaughter.

Political upheaval 
Following Peter Klöckner's death on 5 October 1940, Günther Henle took over as Managing Director of the Group. Due to the company's strategic importance for the German arms industry, the Klöckner plants fell under Nazi control during the turmoil of the war. After being ousted from his position as Managing Director of the Klöckner Group by the Nazis in 1942, Henle fled briefly to Berlin but soon returned and took over the management of Klöckner & Co. Even during the Nazi regime, the trading company remained relatively independent. Normal trading, however, was scarcely possible during the war years.

New beginnings and the Wirtschaftswunder 
After the war, the Klöckner Group fell under the supervision of the Allies. Their aim was to break up the large corporation. Despite these difficult conditions, Klöckner & Co managed to make a fresh start surprisingly quickly. Like the other Klöckner enterprises, the trading company benefited from the rapid upswing in international demand for iron and steel. Following the divestiture of Klöckner-Werke AG and Klöckner-Humboldt-Deutz AG in the 1950s, Klöckner evolved into a diversified organization. Steel sales in Germany were very profitable during the Wirtschaftswunder years. Foreign branches bolstered international business. Klöckner broadening its spectrum from plastics to heating oil and from the maritime industry to burner technology.

International expansion 
After the Wirtschaftswunder era, Klöckner responded to fundamental changes in the steel market by offering more services, reorganizing its warehouses and stepping up international trading operations. The company expanded other trading areas alongside its core business of steel distribution and tapped into new fields of business. In the late 1980s, a failed crude-oil futures contract plunged the company into a crisis. The losses incurred cost 600 million Deutschmarks. Peter Henle, who was responsible for the business segment concerned, accepted the consequences and resigned from the Group's management.

Deutsche Bank provided 400 million Deutschmarks to cover the losses and thus staving off bankruptcy. Deutsche Bank took over the company and transformed it into a joint stock company. For the first time in its history stretching back over 80 years, Klöckner was no longer a family-run business. As part of the rescue package, ownership of the tradition-steeped enterprise was transferred to VIAG. Under the new management, the 1990s saw Klöckner evolve into a contemporary, international distribution specialist operating in areas such as steel, PC products, chemicals, textiles and tent systems. Klöckner significantly expanded its international presence in steel during these years.

Focusing on core business 
In spring 1997, Klöckner announced its decision to retrain the focus on its core business, steel and metal distribution. This move was brought to life with a new logo featuring the Klöckner & Co dog and the slogan “multi metal distribution,” which are still the face of the company today.

As Klöckner continued to expand its stockholding steel distribution in Europe, it set about divesting those segments that were no longer part of the Group's core business. In 1997, Klöckner & Co spun off the textiles activities to a non-consolidated unit in preparation for their sale. At the end of the year, the Group transferred its remaining stake in Thyssen Klöckner Recycling GmbH to the majority shareholder. Early 1998 saw the sale of Klöckner Chemiehandel GmbH. Computer 2000 AG changed hands in the summer of 1998 and was bought by the US company Tech Data Corporation. Around the same time, Klöckner also disposed of Röder Zeltsysteme und Service AG as planned, and transferred its remaining stake in Klöckner Industrie-Anlagen GmbH (INA) to the majority shareholder.

After all these changes, Klöckner had completely restructured within just 15 months. What was once a diversified conglomerate had become a pure steel and metal distributor. Business volume as measured by sales fell by half, from 18.6 billion Deutschmarks in 1997 to 9.5 billion in 1998. The workforce shrank from 14,655 to 10,752.

In the fall of 1998, the then parent company, VIAG, announced its intention to part ways with the Duisburg steel distributor. In 2001, Klöckner & Co was sold to the Balli Group, a UK-based raw materials trader. At the time, Klöckner's workforce numbered 10,000 and its annual sales came to €4.8 billion. But the Balli Group's two Iranian owners had financed the approximately €1.1 billion takeover this way: Hassan Alaghband and Vahid Alaghband admitted to having siphoned off €47.5 million from the Klöckner & Co Group's accounts even prior to the takeover for the purposes of financing the transaction. Previously, the sum that moved from Klöckner & Co accounts to Switzerland was reported to have been €120 million. The brothers each received suspended sentences of one-and-a-half years and fines of between €1.75 million and €2.25 million for embezzlement and abetting embezzlement. During the trial relating to this financing method, the two owners claimed that WestLB, aware of Balli's financing difficulties, refused them a €150 million loan so the bank itself could take advantage of a lien on the Klöckner shares at Balli's expense and reap the profits for itself.

Two years after the takeover, Balli sold 94.5% of the steel and metal distribution company to WestLB and 5.1% to Hamburgische Landesbank. Along with the change of ownership, there was also a change in the Group's top management: Dr. Thomas Ludwig, who had been a member of Klöckner & Co's Management Board from 1991 to 1995, was appointed the new CEO. Under his aegis, the company resumed its course of strategic expansion.

Stock market flotation 
In 2005, Klöckner was sold to the US private equity company Lindsay Goldberg & Bessemer (LGB), which finally launched it on the stock market in June 2006 and went on to sell the majority of its stake in October of that year. Currently, all the company's shares are publicly traded (public float) as of August 2011.
The shares are admitted to trading on the regulated market of the Frankfurt Stock Exchange with additional post-admission obligations (Prime Standard). Klöckner & Co shares were admitted to the MDAX index of the German Stock Exchange on 29 January 2007. The shares have been listed on the SDAX index since 21 March 2016. Klöckner & Co ranks among Germany's 160 largest listed companies. Identified institutional investors now hold 62% of all shares, which makes them the largest group of shareholders. Most of the institutional investors are from Germany and the USA. Another 27% of shares are in the hands of private investors.

Expansive acquisition strategy 
Since its 2006 IPO, Klöckner & Co has pursued an expansive acquisition strategy, with takeovers already totaling 26 companies. Klöckner & Co now ranks among Germany's 80 largest listed companies. In April 2007, Klöckner announced its takeover of steel distributor Primary Steel through its US subsidiary Namasco. The new US subsidiary enabled Klöckner to significantly expand its activities there, with sales soaring by some 60%.

In April 2008, Ulrich Becker was appointed to the Management Board. In addition to the Group's operating activities in Europe, Klöckner Global Sourcing's business fell under Becker's purview along with logistics, process management and international product management. Shortly after his appointment, the company was converted into a European Public Company (SE) in August 2008, and was known from then on as Klöckner & Co SE.

In November 2009, Gisbert Rühl replaced Thomas Ludwig as CEO of Klöckner & Co. In addition to that office, Rühl also retained his function as CFO of the Group. Ten days after Gisbert Rühl took office, Klöckner signed a preliminary agreement to acquire Becker Stahl-Service Group (BSS). Klöckner & Co completed the takeover of Bläsi AG in January 2010, ending the temporary suspension of its acquisition strategy triggered by the global economic crisis; on 1 March 2010, the Klöckner & Co Management Board announced that the BSS acquisition had been brought to a successful conclusion.

Klöckner acquired Macsteel Service Centers USA in April 2011. In May 2011, the company took over Frefer, Brazil's third largest independent steel and metal distributor. The following month, Klöckner effected a rights issue. The issue of 33,250,000 new no-par-value shares generated net issue proceeds of some €516 million, earmarked chiefly for the continued pursuit of the “Klöckner & Co 2020” growth strategy. At the end of 2011, Kloeckner Metals (Changshu) Co., Ltd., a subsidiary of Klöckner & Co, opened. The Group's first-ever steel service center in China is located in Changshu, an urban municipality in the east of the People's Republic near Shanghai and the provinces of Shandong, Zhejiang, Jiangsu and Anhui. Until then, Kloeckner Metals had supplied machinery and mechanical engineering companies located primarily in the greater Changshu area from Europe.

Against the backdrop of shrinking demand for steel in Europe coupled with uncertain economic prospects, the Group had launched a comprehensive restructuring program back in the fall of 2011 which entailed selling or closing 70 locations and cutting some 2,200 jobs. Klöckner completed the restructuring program at the end of 2013, as announced by CEO Gisbert Rühl at the financial statements press conference on 6 March 2014.

Digitalization 
As part of its long-term growth strategy, Klöckner & Co has set itself the goal of digitalizing its entire supply chain. Klöckner & Co set up kloeckner.i, its Group Center of Competence for digitalization, in late 2014. Around 90 employees work there in the areas of product management, software development, data science & AI, business intelligence & analytics, online marketing and user experience & design. In addition, Klöckner & Co founded XOM Materials, an industry platform open to competitors, in 2018. Specially developed applications such as the Kloeckner Assistant, which automates the processing of customer inquiries using artificial intelligence, are driving up the company's digital transformation. By automating the core processes, Klöckner & Co is to become a platform company. In addition to setting up its own digital services, Klöckner & Co is investing in start-ups via the venture company kloeckner.v.

References

External links 

Commodity markets
Steel
Companies based in Duisburg